Alexis Michaud is a French linguist specialising in the study of Southeast Asian languages, especially Naic languages and Vietnamese. He is also known for his work on the typology of tonal languages and as a foremost proponent of Panchronic phonology. He is one of the main editors of the Pangloss Collection. He works at the LACITO research centre within Centre National de la Recherche Scientifique.

He is member of the editorial board of journals such as Linguistics of the Tibeto-Burman Area and associate editor of the Journal of the International Phonetic Association.

A documentary film entitled Sound Hunter was made about his fieldwork in Yunnan, China.

Representative publications
 
 
 
 Michaud, Alexis. 2006. “Replicating in Naxi (Tibeto-Burman) an experiment designed for Yorùbá: An approach to ‘prominence-sensitive prosody’ vs. ‘calculated prosody’”, Proceedings of Speech Prosody 2006, Dresden. Available online.
 
 
 
 
 
 Michaud, Alexis (2012), "Monosyllabicization: Patterns of Evolution in Asian Languages", in Nicole Nau; Thomas Stolz; Cornelia Stroh, Monosyllables: From Phonology to Typology, Berlin: Akademie Verlag, pp. 115–130.
 Michaud, Alexis (2015) Online Na-English-Chinese Dictionary, version 1.0 
 Alexis Michaud 2017. Tone in Yongning Na: Lexical tones and morphotonology, Berlin: Language Science Press.

Notes

External links
 Professional page
  "Sound Hunter": A documentary film on Michaud's work (Tianjin TV, 2012) 
 Publications available from the Open Archive HAL

Linguists from France
Phonologists
Phoneticians
Living people
1975 births
French National Centre for Scientific Research scientists